Selom Kwame Gavor (born ) is a South African professional rugby union player for the  in the Rugby Challenge. He usually plays as a winger.

Career

Western Province

Gavor played rugby for Rondebosch Boys' High School in Cape Town. One of his replacement appearances came against  in the semi-finals in a 24–14 victory and he was also named on the bench in the final, but failed to make an appearance as his side beat  22–18 to clinch the title.

Gavor was included in the  squad for the 2013 Varsity Cup and the  squad for the 2013 Under-21 Provincial Championship.

Golden Lions

He was included in university side 's squad for the 2014 Varsity Cup. He didn't make any appearances in the competition proper, but was included on the bench for their relegation play-off match against . However, he was unused in their 42–8 victory to retain their Varsity Cup status.

He also started the final, but ended on the losing side as  won the match 30–6 to win the competition for the fifth time. He made eleven starts for the  side in the 2014 Under-21 Provincial Championship, scoring eight tries (which included braces in matches against  and ), helping them qualify for the semi-finals. However, despite beating the Blue Bulls twice during the regular season, they could not repeat the feat in the semi-final, losing 19–23 to their Gauteng rivals and eventual champions.

Gavor made two more appearances off the bench for the Golden Lions during the 2015 Vodacom Cup competition in their two matches against the Pumas; a 24–16 victory in Nelspruit in Round Five of the competition and a 20–43 defeat in Johannesburg in the semi-finals.

References

South African rugby union players
Living people
1993 births
Rugby union wings
Golden Lions players